The China Business Review is the official online magazine of the US-China Business Council, covering business, economics, and politics in both the United States and China that affect business in China across a wide variety of industries. The print magazine, published bimonthly, was established in 1974 as a source of trade and investment news. In 2011, the print magazine switched to a quarterly publication schedule. In April 2013, the magazine ceased print publication, going to an online-only format.

The magazine is based in Washington DC.

References

External links
 

Bimonthly magazines published in the United States
Business magazines published in the United States
Online magazines published in the United States
Quarterly magazines published in the United States
English-language magazines
Magazines established in 1974
Magazines disestablished in 2013
Online magazines with defunct print editions
Magazines published in Washington, D.C.